Shok may refer to:

Shok, Afghanistan Battle of Shok Valley
Shok (film), 2015 Kosovar short film
Shoks, snack food Hula Hoops
Le Shok, American band